Small World is the fifth album by American rock band Huey Lewis and the News, released in 1988. It was also their last album release on Chrysalis Records in the USA.

Although it reached the top 20 on the Billboard 200 albums chart, the album did not sell as well as the band's previous albums, Sports and Fore!. However, Lewis himself stated in a Behind the Music interview that the recording process for Small World had the most favorable working conditions.

Recording
The album track "Slammin'" was written for the purpose of being used for highlights for the San Francisco 49ers NFL football team, whom the band and especially Lewis are big fans of. "We thought it'd be a cool idea to have an instrumental on the record. Very old school," Lewis recalled. Lewis joked that the song should've just been called "49er Highlights". The team would indeed use the song for game highlights.

Track listing
"Small World (Part One)" (Chris Hayes, Huey Lewis) – 3:55
"Old Antone's" (Johnny Colla, Lewis) – 4:47
"Perfect World" (Alex Call) – 4:07
"Bobo Tempo" (John Ciambotti, Sean Hopper, Lewis) – 4:39
"Small World (Part Two)" (Hayes, Lewis) – 4:06
"Walking with the Kid" (Hayes, Lewis, Geoffrey Palmer) – 3:59
"World to Me" (Hayes, Lewis) – 5:21
"Better Be True" (Colla, Lewis) – 5:19
"Give Me the Keys (And I'll Drive You Crazy)" (Bill Gibson, Lewis, Steve Lewis) – 4:35
"Slammin'" (instrumental; Greg Adams, Hayes, Palmer) – 4:32

Personnel 
Huey Lewis and the News
 Huey Lewis – harmonica, vocals
 Mario Cipollina – bass
 Johnny Colla – guitar, saxophone, backing vocals
 Bill Gibson – percussion, drums, backing vocals
 Chris Hayes – guitar, backing vocals
 Sean Hopper – keyboards, backing vocals

Additional personnel

 Tower of Power – horns (1, 3, 5, 9, 10):
 Emilio Castillo – tenor saxophone
 Steve Grove – tenor saxophone
 Stephen "Doc" Kupka – baritone saxophone
 Greg Adams – trumpet, horn arrangements 
 Lee Thornburg – trumpet
 Bruce Hornsby – accordion (2), backing vocals (2)
 Peter Michael – percussion (1, 2, 3, 5, 7, 9, 10)
 Stan Getz – tenor saxophone (1, 5)
 Ralph Arista – backing vocals (4, 6)
 Michael Duke – backing vocals (4, 7)
 Jerome Fletcher – backing vocals (4)
 Joel Jaffe – backing vocals (4)
 Jim Moran – backing vocals (4, 6)
 David Tolmie – backing vocals (4)
 Dwight Clark – backing vocals (6)
 Riki Ellison – backing vocals (6)
 Ronnie Lott – backing vocals (6)
 Joe Montana – backing vocals (6)
 Jim "Watts" Vereecke – backing vocals (6)
 David Fredericks – backing vocals (7)

Production 

 Huey Lewis and the News – producers
 Bob Brown – executive producer
 Robert Missbach – engineer, mixing
 Jeffrey "Nik" Norman – additional engineer
 Michael Rosen – assistant engineer
 Tom Size – assistant engineer
 Jim "Watts" Vereecke – assistant engineer
 Bob Ludwig – mastering
 Ralph Arista – guitar technician 
 Jerry Daniels – keyboard technician
 Carl Ciasulli – drum technician
 Terry Persons – production manager
 Craig Frazier – art direction, design 
 Jock McDonald – photography 
 Roger Ressmeyer – cover photography
 Chris Welch – liner notes

Studios 
 Recorded at Studio D Recording (Sausalito, California).
 Mixed at Fantasy Studios (Berkeley, California).
 Mastered at Masterdisk (New York, NY).

Charts

Weekly charts

Year-end charts

Singles

Certifications

References

1988 albums
Huey Lewis and the News albums
Chrysalis Records albums